Kovilambakkam is a southern suburb of Chennai, India. It is located in Chengalpattu district in the state of Tamil Nadu, about 26 km from Chennai city center and 12 km from Tambaram. The neighbourhood spans the areas of Sunnambu Kolathur, Chinna Kovilambakkam and Periya Kovilambakkam.

Governance
The neighbourhood is administered by the Kovilambakkam Village Panchayat, which is under control of St. Thomas Mount Panchayat Union, Chengalpattu district. The area and population of Kovilambakkam is so huge that it consists of two revenue villages spanning two different districts in Tamil Nadu, namely, Kovilambakkam revenue village (which comes under Tambaram taluk in Chengalpattu district) and Madipakkam-B revenue village (which comes under Sholinganallur taluk in Chennai district).  Madipakkam-B is commonly referred to by the villagers by its 800-year-old name Sunnambu Kolathur.

Demographics 
As of 2011[update] India census, Kovilambakkam had a population of 27,374. Males constitute 13,935 of the population and females 13,439. There were 7,010 households. Kovilambakkam has an average literacy rate of 72.55%, higher than the national average of 59.5%: male literacy is 55.7%, and female literacy is 44.3%. In Kovilambakkam, 14% of the population is under 6 years of age.

Geography
The neighbourhood has a lake known as the Kovilambakkam lake. It is connected with the Pallikaranai Marsh by means of a 4-km-long surplus channel to drain rainwater. The canal has a carrying capacity of 12,000 cusecs (cubic feet per second) of water. However, there are complaints of sewage being dumped into the canal by the Tambaram City Municipal Corporation

Infrastructure
Kovilambakkam is located along the Pallavaram–Thoraipakkam 200-feet Radial Road. It is also one of the neighbourhoods that will be connected by the phase II network of the Chennai Metro currently under construction.

Schools and colleges 
 Govt. Higher Secondary School
 DAV Co-ed School, Pallikaranai (located in Kovilambakkam) 
 A. V. G. Vidyalaya Matriculation School
 Nethaji Vidhyalayam School
 Golden School
 Pole Star Matriculation School
 Himayam Matriculation School
 Panchayat Union Primary School
 Srujana International school (formerly Srujana Montessori School)

Areas surrounding of the locality

References

External links 
 WIKIMAPIA
 Undermining Farm Wells
 At cremation ground, it's trash that burns
 Village panchayats to get new roads
 Village panchayats to get new roads

Cities and towns in Chengalpattu district